Chantel Lily Jeffrey (born 18 July 2001) is a Canadian swimmer. In 2019, she competed in the women's 5 km and women's 10 km events at the 2019 World Aquatics Championships held in Gwangju, South Korea. In the 5 km event she finished in 28th place and in the 10 km event she finished in 45th place. In 2019, she also competed in the women's marathon 10 kilometres at the 2019 Pan American Games held in Lima, Peru and she finished in 9th place.

References

External links 
 
 
 Chantel Lily Jeffrey at the 2019 Pan American Games
 

2001 births
Living people
Canadian female long-distance swimmers
Pan American Games competitors for Canada
Swimmers at the 2019 Pan American Games
People from Salmon Arm
Sportspeople from British Columbia
21st-century Canadian women